is a Japanese anime television series about humans using robots in tournaments. Created by Aeon and Takara and animated by Brain's Base, the studio’s first television production, the series aired on TV Tokyo from April to December 2002. A series of Daigunder toys were produced that could interact with TV screens.

Plot
Set in a futuristic time where talking robots are common, there is a tournament where robot teams pit off against each other in. The Battle Robots look like humans and transforming animals.

A boy named Akira Akebono plans to win the Titan Belt with his robots Bulion, Eaglearrow, Drimog, Bonerex, Despector, Trihorn, Ryugu and also Daigu who form the mighty Daigunder. The Daigunder unit was a creation of Akira's grandfather Professor Hajime Akebono. Managed by a girl named Haruka Hoshi, Team Akira enters many tournaments for Akira to reach his goal. However, there are many occasions when a Battle Robot named Ginzan is out to destroy Daigunder. Ginzan does this under the orders of the evil and mysterious Professor Maelstrom and he is later joined by Tigamaru and Rogamaru. Akira and his friends soon find a new ally in DragonBurst and new comrades in his assistants DragonFlame and DragonFreezer.

Characters

Team Akira
Akira and his robots' base of operations is Dailand and they get around in their plane called the Daishuttle. Team Akira's Battle Robots consist of the Daigunder Unit (Ryugu, Daigu, DragonFlame and DragonFreezer), the Animal Unit (Bulion, Eaglearrow and Drimog), and the Dino Unit (Bonerex, Despector and Trihorn). When damaged, Sabuto gives them upgrades whenever they need it.

 
 
 The Commander of Team Akira, Akira is the grandson of famed Battle Robot creator Hajime Akebono. His dreams of winning the Titan Belt lead him to compete or the Battle Robot Tournament. He challenges other teams with his group of robots. His most powerful and trusted ones is Ryugu and Daigu. The first robot of Team Akira was Bulion (also Hajime's first creation), who Akira played with even as a child.

 
 
 Haruka Hoshi (initially spelled Haruka in the closed captioning, then changed to "Heruka" [sic] to match the English pronunciation) is a young girl who looking to become a manager of Team Akira & a Battle Robots team. After Team Akira defeats Team John & gains a Battle Robot License, she becomes Akira's manager & helps to tune up his robots.

 
 
 Hajime Akebono is a scientist who is Akira's grandfather. He is a famous Battle Robot Creator who created the robots that Akira uses, including DragoBurst along with Professor Maelstrom but DragonFlame, DragonFreezer and DragoBurst have gone berserk and gone against them years ago. Hajime later made the Animal Unit (made up of Bulion, Eaglearrow and Drimog) and then the Dino Unit (made up of Bonerex, Despector and Trihorn) and eventually the Cluster System, which is made up of Ryugu and Daigu, who combine to form Daigunder. He likes to travel to different places. It is to be noted that Bulion was Hajime's first powerful battle robot.

 
 A small robot that does the maintenance on Team Akira's robots.

Daigunder Unit
A creation of Professor Hajime,  is the Metamorphic Fusion of Ryugu and Daigu. Nicknamed the "King of the Battle Robots", he was equipped with special system called the Cluster System. Daigunder can attack his enemies with his Dragon Cannon (his finisher) and Dragon Sword. With Despector as his left arm he can perform the Echo Blast. When Both DragonFlame and DragonFreeze weapon use with Daigunder, it can use its most powerful attack, the Dragon Buster. He can also combine with DragoBurst.

 
 
 Ryugu is Akira's constant companion and as stubborn as he is. At first he refuses to obey Akira, until he sees Akira protect him. His attacks are Knight Slash and Knight Quake. Ryugu is a small knight robot.

 
 
 Daigu never fights unless fused with either Ryugu, Bulion or Bonerex. While he most often all he says is "Daigu!" he has spoken other words on occasion. He is a dragon robot.

 
 Part of the Daigunder Unit. One of two robots built by Professors Hajime and Maelstrom when they were partners. After finding out about Big Bang's true motives, DragonFlame and DragonFreezer ran off with their leader DragoBurst on a space station in outer space. Later on in the series, they joined Team Akira. DragonFlame's animal is a Fire Dragon and attacks with Magma Dynamic. DragonFlame can Armor Fuse and become a sword by saying Saber Change for either DragoBuster or Daigunder. Like Daigu, DragonFlame mostly says one word "Flame!". DragonFlame can also combine with DragonFreezeer to become a kind of two-headed dragon for Daigunder to ride on for flight.

 
 Part of the Daigunder Unit. One of two robots built by Professors Hajime and Maelstrom when they were partners. After finding out about Big Bang's true motives, DragonFreezer and DragonFlame ran off with their leader DragoBuster on a space station in outer space. Later on in the series, they joined Team Akira. DragonFreezer's animal is an Ice Dragon and attacks with Blizzard Strike. DragonFreezer can Armor Fuse by saying Shield Change and become a shield for either DragoBuster or Daigunder. Like Daigu and DragonFlame, DragonFreezer mostly says one word "Freeze!". DragonFreezer can also combine with DragonFlame to become some kind of two-headed dragon for Daigunder to ride on for flight.

Bulion

 is the Leader of Team Akira's Animal Unit and attacks with his Thunder Claw attack. His animal form is a lion. He can Metamorphic Fuse with Daigu to become  who attacks with his "Thunder Fang Battle Claw". With Eaglearrow and Drimog on his arms he can perform the Daigulion Blaster, and his finisher is "Thunder Fang Battle Claw". Bulion could also Armor Fuse with DragonBurst to become .

Bonerex

 is the leader of the Dino Unit who attacked the mayor's town when the mayor was placing an amusement park in the Dino Units area. He and the Dino Unit later joined Akira and attacks with his Bone Blade attack. His animal form is a Tyrannosaurus. Bonerex can also Armor Fuse with DragoBurst to form .

Megarex
 is the Power Fusion of Eaglearrow, Drimog, Despector, and Trihorn. This combination is seldom used, as it sometimes takes a lot of power out of them. Eaglearrow forms the chest armor. Drimog forms the lower torso and legs. Despector forms the back and wings. Trihorn forms the head, upper torso, arms and feet. Megarex is powerful enough to withstand Ginzan's Power Blast attack.

 
 
 Member of the Animal Unit. He is one of the fliers of Team Akira since his animal form is an eagle. Constantly argues with Drimog. Attacks with Fire Arrow.

 
 
 Member of the Animal Unit who can dig underground. His animal form is a mole and he constantly argues with Eaglearrow. Attacks with Crash Burn.

 
 
 Member of the Dino Unit that joins Team Akira. One of Team Akira's fliers. His animal form is a Pteranodon. Attacks with Specter Slash.

 
 
 Member of the Dino Unit that joins with Akira. He can be a bit dumb at times. His animal form is a Triceratops. Attacks with Horn Strike.

Allies
 
 
 Commissioner Spinklestarber is the one of the Battle Robots Tournament who observes all tournaments. A running gag is that Akira cannot seem to get his name right.

 
 
 A Battle Robot who worked for the mysterious Professor Maelstrom that attacked Daigunder on different occasions, nicknaming himself the "Ultimate Battle Robot". Although an enemy to Team Akira initially, he did team up with Akira and the Daigunder Unit for an Armor Fusion on some occasions like getting out of a cavern with sentient acidic liquid, subduing an out of control Battle Robot, and helping to find an abducted king. Ginzan can combine with Daigunder for an attack called "Dragon Revolver". The "Dragon Revolver" is one of the most powerful attacks, best remembered for almost destroying DragonFlame and DragonFreeze in space. Yet another notable Dragon Revolver attack was on Sacred Steel Tortoise, as it was successful in piercing its powerful shield. After learning about honor from Daigunder, he has begun to switch sides and eventually betrayed Professor Maelstrom when he learned his true intentions and how he felt that robots were merely tools. After fighting against Daigunder with Akira as his commander as part of a test, Ginzan decides to go away for a while and perhaps someday join Team Akira, as he now considers Akira his new commander. His animal form is a winged unicorn, his attacks include Spin Revolver and his best attack is Ultimate Revolver which forms the face of a Unicorn during its attack. After Maelstrom changed his ways, Ginzan returned to him along with Tigamaru and Rougamaru.

 
 
 A robot built by Professors Hajime and Deikun when they were partners. After finding out about Maelstrom's true motives, he ran off and now he lives with his two companions DragonFlame and DragonFreezer on a space station in outer space. His ultimate goal is to get Daigunder on his team, destroy humanity and thereby establish a Robot Utopia. He can Armor Fuse with Daigunder to form  with DragoFlame as a sword and DragoFreezer as a shield and attacks with his Burst Cannon and Dragon Nova. After some talking-to from Akira and Daigunder, DragoBurst realized the truth about humans and helped Team Akira destroy Maelstrom's giant turtle robot using the power of the Cluster System. His animal form is a Black Dragon and attacks with Buster Black Hole and Energy Fist. He is also capable of hypnotizing robots with his "Dragon Wave".

Villains
 
 The primary antagonist of the series. Professor Maelstrom was once Professor Hajime's partner when he was originally known as Professor Deikun. Together they built DragoBurst. When DragoBurst found out that Professor Deikun planned to use him to take over the world, he fired at him thus destroying the laboratory and left. Many years later, he has returned complete with a metal eye due to the accident. He built Ginzan, Tigamaru, and Rogamaru to defeat Daigunder for unknown purposes. After Dragon Daigunder destroyed his ultimate Battle Robot, he changed his ways. His most powerful robotic invention was the "Sacred Steel Tortoise" as he thought it was the destined end of Daigunder and Dragonburst.

 
 
 One of two robots who join up with Ginzan to destroy Daigunder. He, along with Rogamaru, often uses trickery and deceit in their schemes to defeat Daigunder. He can combine with Rogamaru to form  with either of them at the top. Tigamaru's animal form is a tiger. Tigamaru's attack is the Tiga Whirldwind Slicer.

 
 
 One of two robots who join up with Ginzan to destroy Daigunder. He, along with Tigamaru, often uses trickery and deceit in their schemes to defeat Daigunder. He can combine with Tigamaru to form  with either of them at the top. Rogamaru's animal form is a wolf. Rogamaru’s attack is the Loga Moon Slicer.

Episodes
 The Dream Begins 
 Step One 
 Training Battle 
 Hybrid Match 
 Enter Ginzan 
 Robot Round Up 
 Bots Will Be Bots 
 There Is No "I" In Team 
 Been There, Done That 
 Friend or Foe 
 Battling with Style 
 Loose as a Caboose  
 The Mystery of Team X 
 The Enemy Within 
 Too Many Robots Spoil The Broth 
 A Royal Pain 
 Brits, Bots and Betty 
 A New Friend 
 Two Bots or Not Two Bots? 
 Goon With The Wind 
 Fight or Get Off The Bot 
 A Battle Down Memory Lane 
 Fire and Ice 
 The Stand in the Sand 
 Maelstrom's Madness 
 Daigunder My Thumb 
 The Battle for Ryugu 
 Maybe the Grass Ain't Greener 
 Dazed and Kamfused 
 Teamwork 
 A Lesson Earned is a Lesson Learned 
 Doctor Bridget Explains it All 
 Desperate Trap for Daigunder 
 Maelstrom vs. Dragon Burst 
 History of the Title Grosser 
 Charge! Fight for the Hard Foughted

Cast

Japanese Cast
 Fujiko Takimoto as Akira
 Juri Ihata as Haruka
 Yuki Kaida as Ryugu
 Kiyoyuki Yanada as Daigu/Daigunder
 Isshin Chiba as Eaglearrow & Trihorn
 Kazuhiro Nakata as Boss
 Keiichi Sonobe as Announcer
 Kōichi Tōchika as Despector
 Masaya Onosaka as Drimog
 Nobutoshi Canna as Taigamaru
 Nobuyuki Hiyama as Rougamaru
 Norio Wakamoto as Dragonburst
 Ryotaro Okiayu as Bone Rex/Daigurex
 Susumu Chiba as Ginzan
 Tetsu Inada as Bulion/Daigulion
 Tomohisa Asou as Dr. Hajime

English Cast
 Steve Blum - Professor Hajime Akebono
 Joey D'Auria - Commissioner Spinklestarber
 Richard Epcar - Eaglearrow
 Barbara Goodson - Akira Akebono
 Steve Kramer - Drimog
 Lex Lang - Despector, Tri-Horn
 Brad MacDonald - Rogamaru/Wolf Fang
 Dave Mallow - Track Announcer
 Michael McConnohie - Tigamaru/Tiger Fang
 Lara Jill Miller - Haruka Hoshi
 Bob Papenbrook - Bulion/Daigulion
 Paul Schrier - Bone Rex/Daigurex
 Joshua Seth - Ryugu
 Michael Sorich - Daigu/Daigunder
 Tom Wyner - Ginzan

Additional voices
 Mona Marshall - Makoto
 Jason C. Miller - 
 Philece Sampler - Dr. Bridget (in "Brits, Bots, and Betty")
 Brianne Siddall - Jimmy (in "A New Friend")
 Kari Wahlgren -

Crew

English Crew
 Tony Oliver - Producer
 Scott Page-Pagter - Voice Director

Theme Songs
 "Bakuto Sengen! Daigunder" by Masaaki Endoh (OP)
 "We Are the Heroes" by Hiroshi Kitadani (ED)

Home Media
The entire series has been released as a 10-volume VHS in Japan by Nippon Columbia. The series has not been released in DVD or available digitally at Amazon Japan or Hulu. It was released on DVD in the United Kingdom.

References

External links
 Daigunder at Internet Movie Database
 

2002 Japanese television series debuts
2002 Japanese television series endings
2002 anime television series debuts
Anime with original screenplays
Brain's Base
English-language television shows
Jetix original programming
Nippon Animation
TV Tokyo original programming
Takara Tomy franchises
Takara Tomy
Takara video games
Toys-to-life games
Transforming toy robots
Video games about mecha